Edmonton City Centre is a shopping mall in the downtown core of Edmonton, Alberta, Canada, across the street (west) from Churchill Square.

History
In 1974, the City Centre Place office tower (Oxford Tower) was completed within the larger Edmonton Centre development; TD Tower was added in 1976.  In 1978, Oxford Tower (now MNP Tower) and the Four Seasons Hotel (now Sandman Signature Edmonton) were built on the north edge of the site. Across the street a new development was in planning by Triple Five Corporation. The original plan for what was then called Eaton Centre, announced in 1980, called for several large office and apartment towers. None of the originally designed five towers was ever built but the multi-level Eaton Centre mall and the Delta Edmonton Centre Suite Hotel were salvaged from the project by heavy civic tax subsidies.

After the demise of the Eaton's department store in 1999, Eaton Centre and Edmonton Centre, formerly two independent malls, were redeveloped into one shopping complex connected by a newer and larger pedestrian bridge spanning 101 Street (that itself contains a number of shops).

On June 27, 2013, Empire Theatres announced that it would be selling this theatre location along with 22 others in Western Canada and Ontario to Landmark Cinemas. On October 29, 2013, Empire Theatres closed and reopened as Landmark Cinemas on October 31, 2013.

On November 18, 2015, Edmonton City Centre announced that it planned to relocate and significantly upgrade its food court as part of a $41.3-million redevelopment investment that would revitalize the entire retail experience of the downtown property. Construction was scheduled to begin in November 2015. The new food court opened on November 1, 2016, and the property revitalization project would be complete by November 2017. The former food court area and stores on the lower level were converted to parking.

Hudson's Bay closed on June 3, 2021.

Anchors
Landmark Cinemas
Sport Chek
Winners

Former anchors
 Hudson's Bay (closed on June 3, 2021)

Business
ECC is home to two office towers and one unique office conversion property located on the site of the original Woodwards: TD Tower, Oxford Tower and Centre Point Place are all connected to the shopping centre by way of integrated pedway. These office properties combine for a total of approximately 665,000 square feet with the towers ranging from 24 to 28 storeys in height.

CBC
The Canadian Broadcasting Corporation's English and French services in Edmonton are located at Edmonton City Centre. CBC operations based at ECC include television stations CBXT-DT and CBXFT-DT; as well as the radio stations CBX, CBX-FM, and CHFA-FM.

See also
 Eaton Centre

References

External links
Edmonton City Centre
Oxford Leasing - Edmonton City Centre

Eaton's
Shopping malls in Edmonton
Shopping malls established in 1974
Tourist attractions in Edmonton
Oxford Properties
Canadian Broadcasting Corporation buildings